The Journal of the History of Sexuality is a peer-reviewed academic journal established in 1990 and published by the University of Texas Press.

Indexing 
The Journal of the History of Sexuality is indexed and/or abstracted in America: History and Life, Bibliography of the History of Art, Criminal Justice Abstracts, Current Contents/Social and Behavioral Sciences, Historical Abstracts, International Bibliography of Periodical Literature, MLA Directory of Periodicals, MLA International Bibliography, and Social Sciences Citation Index. According to the Journal Citation Reports, the journal has a 2013 impact factor of 0.487, ranking it 10th out of 72 journals in the category "History" and 102nd out of 138 journals in the category "Sociology".

References

External links 
 
 Journal page at Project MUSE

Sexology journals
Publications established in 1990
Triannual journals
English-language journals
University of Texas Press academic journals